Ronan Mullarney (born 12 September 1995) is an Irish professional golfer from Galway, he has been a professional since 2019. On 28 June 2022, Mullarney qualified for the Open Championship for the first time after sharing second place with Jamie Rutherford in the 36-hole Final Qualifying competition at Prince's Golf Club in Kent.

Mullarney attended Maynooth University. In 2018, he won the R&A Foundation Scholars Tournament at St Andrews, a win that gave him a place in the 2018 Arnold Palmer Cup. In 2019, he won the Irish Amateur Close Championship at Ballybunion, beating Robert Brazill in the final.

Amateur wins
2016 Mullingar Electrical Scratch Trophy
2017 BUCS Golf Tour - Fife Tournament
2018 R&A Foundation Scholars Tournament, Irish Student Amateur Open Championship, BUCS Golf Tour - Stirling International
2019 Irish Amateur Close Championship

Source:

Results in major championships

CUT = missed the half-way cut

Team appearances
Amateur
Arnold Palmer Cup (representing the International team): 2018
European Amateur Team Championship (representing Ireland): 2019

References

External links
 
 

Irish male golfers
1995 births
Living people